The following highways are numbered 195:

Canada
  Quebec Route 195

India
  State Highway 195 (Maharashtra)

Mexico
  Mexican Federal Highway 195

Japan
  Japan National Route 195

United States
  Various Interstate 195s:
 Interstate 195 (Florida)
 Interstate 195 (Maine)
 Interstate 195 (Maryland)
 Interstate 195 (New Jersey)
 Interstate 195 (Rhode Island-Massachusetts)
 Interstate 195 (Virginia)
  U.S. Route 195
  Alabama State Route 195
  Arizona State Route 195
  Arkansas Highway 195
  California State Route 195
  Connecticut Route 195
  Georgia State Route 195
  Iowa Highway 195 (former)
  K-195 (Kansas highway)
  Kentucky Route 195
  Maine State Route 195
  Maryland Route 195
  M-195 (Michigan highway) (former)
  New Mexico State Road 195
  New York State Route 195 (former)
  North Carolina Highway 195
  Ohio State Route 195
  Rhode Island Route 195 (former)
  Tennessee State Route 195
  Texas State Highway 195
  Farm to Market Road 195 (Texas)
  Utah State Route 195 (former)
  Virginia State Route 195

Territories
  Puerto Rico Highway 195